Ilyocryptus sordidus is a crustacean of the family Ilyocryptidae, a freshwater water flea.

Anatomy
Ilyocryptus sordidus has an intense crimson colour, a small head and its dorsal edge is evenly curved. The second pair of antenna are especially short and coarse. The spine at the base of the abdominal claw is long and slender.

Habitat
Ilyocryptus sordidus lives in the mud of freshwater lakes (inspiring the specific name sordidus, Latin for "dirty"), tolerating pH between 4.2 and 7.1.

Distribution
It is found in most parts of the world, except for Southeast Asia.

References

External links

Ilyocryptidae
Freshwater crustaceans of Asia
Freshwater crustaceans of Africa
Freshwater crustaceans of North America
Freshwater crustaceans of South America
Freshwater crustaceans of Oceania
Freshwater crustaceans of Europe
Crustaceans described in 1848